Lindsay, Texas may refer to:
Lindsay, Cooke County, Texas
Lindsay, Reeves County, Texas

es:Lindsay (Texas)
nl:Lindsay